Robert Ringwood (15 April 1815  — 18 February 1875) was an English first-class cricketer.

Ringwood was born at Cambridge in April 1815. A professional cricketer, he made his debut in first-class cricket for Cambridge Town Club against Cambridge University at Parker's Piece in 1840. He played for a variety of Cambridge-based teams in first-class cricket, making a total of sixteen appearances to 1849. Ringwood was initially selected in the Cambridge team on his bowling, with him taking 28 wickets in first-class cricket, including three five wicket hauls. Denison, in his book Cricket. Sketches of the Players described how in the three years prior to 1846, Ringwood's bowling had become less effective, while also describing him as a "very powerful hitter" when batting. He scored 274 runs in first-class matches, though never passed fifty, with a highest score of 49. Following his first-class career, Ringwood was employed as a clerk at the University of Cambridge by Trinity College in 1870, and in 1872 by Christ's College. Ringwood died at Cambridge in February 1875, his wife having predeceased him by three years.

References

External links

1815 births
1875 deaths
Sportspeople from Cambridge
English cricketers
Cambridge Town Club cricketers
Clerks